Arjan Knipping (born 1 August 1994) is a Dutch swimmer specialising in 200 and 400 metre individual medley. Knipping holds the Dutch national record on the 200 and 400 metre medley.

Career 

He represented the Netherlands at the 2019 World Aquatics Championships and reached the finals in both the 200 and 400 metre individual medley, setting a new national record in both events. With these results he also qualified for the 2020 Summer Olympics in Tokyo, Japan.

He also competed in the 2017 Summer Universiade and 2018 European Aquatics Championships.

Personal bests

References

External links
 

1994 births
Living people
Dutch male freestyle swimmers
Dutch male backstroke swimmers
Dutch male breaststroke swimmers
Dutch male butterfly swimmers
Competitors at the 2017 Summer Universiade
Sportspeople from Gelderland
Swimmers at the 2020 Summer Olympics
Olympic swimmers of the Netherlands
21st-century Dutch people